The Drew Davis Band was an American country music group established in 2001 by Drew Davis (lead vocals, guitar), Mike Drake (guitar, harmonica, fiddle), Loren Ellis (banjo, guitar, mandolin, vocals), Jay Hawks (drums), Mo Levone (bass guitar, vocals), and Roger Malinkowski (keyboards).

In 2004, the band competed in and won the Colgate Country Showdown; shortly afterward, they were signed to Windswept Publishing, with a self-titled EP being released that year. Eventually, they were transferred to 903 Music, a short-lived record label founded by Neal McCoy; upon the label's closure in 2007, the band was transferred to Lofton Creek Records. Both Mike Drake and Jay Hawks have since left the group. The band's debut single, "Back There All the Time", has entered the Billboard Hot Country Songs charts. It was included on both their self-titled EP and on their 2008 album Crossroads. Roger Malinowski left the band in 2009 to be David Spade's stuntman.

The Drew Davis Band was featured on an episode of Gene Simmons Family Jewels on August 9, 2009.  The episode also featured a guest appearance by Trace Adkins. They also performed the theme song for the Disney Channel series Phil of the Future and The Suite Life of Zack & Cody.

Discography

Studio albums

Extended plays

Singles

Music videos

References

Country music groups from California
Lofton Creek Records artists
Musical groups from Los Angeles
Musical groups established in 2004